The 2019 Grand Prix SAR La Princesse Lalla Meryem was a women's professional tennis tournament played on clay courts. It was the 19th edition of the tournament and part of the WTA International tournaments category of the 2019 WTA Tour. It took place in Rabat, Morocco, between 29 April and 4 May 2019.

Points and prize money

Prize money

Singles main draw entrants

Seeds

 Rankings are as of April 22, 2019.

Other entrants
The following players received wildcards into the singles main draw:
  Timea Bacsinszky
  Elise Mertens 
  Isabella Shinikova

The following players received entry from the qualifying draw:
  Ysaline Bonaventure
  Olga Danilović 
  Fiona Ferro
  Varvara Lepchenko

The following player received entry as a lucky loser:
  Irina Bara

Withdrawals
  Ons Jabeur → replaced by  Magda Linette
  Veronika Kudermetova → replaced by  Ana Bogdan
  Petra Martić → replaced by  Irina Bara
  Zheng Saisai → replaced by  Ivana Jorović

Doubles main draw entrants

Seeds 

 1 Rankings as of April 22, 2019.

Other entrants 
The following pairs received wildcards into the doubles main draw:
  Ana Bogdan /  Isabella Shinikova 
  Sada Nahimana /  Lina Qostal

Withdrawals 
During the tournament
  Olga Danilović (right knee injury)

Champions

Singles

  Maria Sakkari def.  Johanna Konta, 2–6, 6–4, 6–1

Doubles

 María José Martínez Sánchez /  Sara Sorribes Tormo def.  Georgina García Pérez /  Oksana Kalashnikova, 7–5, 6–1

References

External links 
 Official website

Morocco Open
Grand Prix SAR La Princesse Lalla Meryem
Morocco
Grand Prix SAR La Princesse Lalla Meryem
Grand Prix SAR La Princesse Lalla Meryem